Junko Yoshioka  is a New York City based fashion designer known primarily for her bridal wear.  She has been the recipient of various awards and other recognitions,  including first place (bridal) at the Millennium Designer Invitational (Tokyo 2000), and was named as one of the Top 100 Influential Japanese People in the World by Japanese Newsweek (2007).

Born in Japan, Junko Yoshioka began her career in Tokyo studying in the Japanese design school, Mode Gakuen, and apprenticing for an Italian designer.  While still a student, a wedding gown design of hers won first prize out of some 10,000 entrants in Tokyo's Creative Competition for Fashion Design. She then spent several years refining her craft in Milan, earning her master's degree at the Marangoni Institute, and designing for MaxMara, Atsuro Tayama and Ante Prima.

In 2002, Yoshioka moved to New York City and launched the Bonaparte-NY line of bridal gowns.  Her styles have been featured in the pages of InStyle, WWD, New York magazine, and the leading bridal publications.

Her signature design style encompasses sweeping silhouettes, asymmetrical cuts and unique hand-crafted details, often creating extra texture and dimension by juxtaposing silks with less traditional materials such as leather and wool.

References
US Magazine:  Actress Helen Hunt in Junko Yoshioka gown
People Magazine (2005) article
El Mundo (Spain, 2008) article
Brides.com review of Junko Yoshioka line

External links
Junko Yoshioka website
Martha Stewart Weddings: Junko Yoshioka collection

Japanese fashion designers
Japanese women fashion designers
Year of birth missing (living people)
Living people